Alfredo Oriani was the lead ship of her class of four destroyers built for the  (Royal Italian Navy) in the mid-1930s. Completed in 1937, she served in World War II. Alfredo Oriani took part of the battle of Matapan and the attack on Harpoon convoy.

Design and description
The Oriani-class destroyers were slightly improved versions of the preceding . Their complement during wartime was 206 officers and enlisted men.

The Orianis were powered by two Parsons geared steam turbines, each driving one propeller shaft using steam supplied by three Thornycroft boilers.

Their main battery consisted of four 50-caliber  guns in two twin-gun turrets, one each fore and aft of the superstructure. Amidships were a pair of 15-caliber 120-millimeter star shell guns. Anti-aircraft (AA) defense for the Oriani-class ships was provided by four  machine guns. The ships were equipped with six  torpedo tubes in two triple mounts amidships. Although they were not provided with a sonar system for anti-submarine work, they were fitted with a pair of depth charge throwers. The ships could carry up to 56 mines.

Construction and career 
Alfredo Oriani was built at the OTO shipyard in Livorno, laid down on 28 October 1935, launched on  30 July 1936 and completed on 15 July 1937.

Alfredo Oriani belonged to the 9th destroyer flotilla of the Royal Italian Navy, which also comprised her sisters Vittorio Alfieri, Giosue Carducci and Vicenzo Gioberti. Oriani survived the Battle of Cape Matapan, where she was severely damaged by the  secondary guns of battleship HMS Warspite.  The destroyer was part of the Italian squadron that engaged the Harpoon convoy on 15 June 1942, where Oriani hit the destroyer HMS Bedouin, and, along with the destroyer Ascari and the cruisers Raimondo Montecuccoli and Eugenio di Savoia, she sunk the already crippled tanker Kentucky and the freighter Burdwan. Oriani launched a torpedo to the drifting hull of Kentucky to secure her sinking. The ship escaped from La Spezia during the Italian Armistice in 1943 and was interned in Malta. The Italian destroyer was given to the French Navy as a war reparation, where she served as the D'Estaing until 1954.

References

Bibliography

External links
 Alfredo Oriani Marina Militare website

Oriani-class destroyers
Ships built in Livorno
1936 ships
World War II destroyers of Italy